Methylthioninium chloride, commonly called methylene blue, is a salt used as a dye and as a medication. Methylene blue is a thiazine dye. As a medication, it is mainly used to treat methemoglobinemia by converting/chemically reducing the ferric iron in hemoglobin to ferrous iron. Specifically, it is used to treat methemoglobin levels that are greater than 30% or in which there are symptoms despite oxygen therapy. It has previously been used for treating cyanide poisoning and urinary tract infections, but this use is no longer recommended.

Methylene blue is typically given by injection into a vein. Common side effects include headache, vomiting, confusion, shortness of breath, and high blood pressure. Other side effects include serotonin syndrome, red blood cell breakdown, and allergic reactions. Use often turns the urine, sweat, and stool blue to green in color. While use during pregnancy may harm the baby, not using it in methemoglobinemia is likely more dangerous.

Methylene blue was first prepared in 1876, by Heinrich Caro. It is on the World Health Organization's List of Essential Medicines.

Medical uses

Methemoglobinemia
Methylene blue is employed as a medication for the treatment of methemoglobinemia, which can arise from ingestion of certain pharmaceuticals, toxins, or broad beans.  Normally, through the NADH or NADPH dependent methemoglobin reductase enzymes, methemoglobin is reduced back to hemoglobin. When large amounts of methemoglobin occur secondary to toxins, methemoglobin reductases are overwhelmed. Methylene blue, when injected intravenously as an antidote, is itself first reduced to leucomethylene blue, which then reduces the heme group from methemoglobin to hemoglobin. Methylene blue can reduce the half life of methemoglobin from hours to minutes.  At high doses, however, methylene blue actually induces methemoglobinemia, reversing this pathway.

Methylphen

Cyanide poisoning
Since its reduction potential is similar to that of oxygen and can be reduced by components of the electron transport chain, large doses of methylene blue are sometimes used as an antidote to potassium cyanide poisoning, a method first successfully tested in 1933 by Dr. Matilda Moldenhauer Brooks in San Francisco, although first demonstrated by Bo Sahlin of Lund University, in 1926.

Dye or stain

Methylene blue is used in endoscopic polypectomy as an adjunct to saline or epinephrine, and is used for injection into the submucosa around the polyp to be removed. This allows the submucosal tissue plane to be identified after the polyp is removed, which is useful in determining if more tissue needs to be removed, or if there has been a high risk for perforation. Methylene blue is also used as a dye in chromoendoscopy, and is sprayed onto the mucosa of the gastrointestinal tract in order to identify dysplasia, or pre-cancerous lesions. Intravenously injected methylene blue is readily released into the urine and thus can be used to test the urinary tract for leaks or fistulas.

In surgeries such as sentinel lymph node dissections, methylene blue can be used to visually trace the lymphatic drainage of tested tissues. Similarly, methylene blue is added to bone cement in orthopedic operations to provide easy discrimination between native bone and cement. Additionally, methylene blue accelerates the hardening of bone cement, increasing the speed at which bone cement can be effectively applied. Methylene blue is used as an aid to visualisation/orientation in a number of medical devices, including a Surgical sealant film, TissuePatch. In fistulas and pilonidal sinuses it is used to identify the tract for complete excision. It can also be used during gastrointestinal surgeries (such as bowel resection or gastric bypass) to test for leaks.

It is sometimes used in cytopathology, in mixtures including Wright-Giemsa and Diff-Quik. It confers a blue color to both nuclei and cytoplasm, and makes the nuclei more visible. When methylene blue is "polychromed" (oxidized in solution or "ripened" by fungal metabolism, as originally noted in the thesis of Dr. D. L. Romanowsky in the 1890s), it gets serially demethylated and forms all the tri-, di-, mono- and non-methyl intermediates, which are Azure B, Azure A, Azure C, and thionine, respectively. This is the basis of the basophilic part of the spectrum of Romanowski-Giemsa effect. If only synthetic Azure B and Eosin Y is used, it may serve as a standardized Giemsa stain; but, without methylene blue, the normal neutrophilic granules tend to overstain and look like toxic granules. On the other hand, if methylene blue is used it might help to give the normal look of neutrophil granules and may also enhance the staining of nucleoli and polychromatophilic RBCs (reticulocytes).

A traditional application of methylene blue is the intravital or supravital staining of nerve fibers, an effect first described by Paul Ehrlich in 1887. A dilute solution of the dye is either injected into tissue or applied to small freshly removed pieces. The selective blue coloration develops with exposure to air (oxygen) and can be fixed by immersion of the stained specimen in an aqueous solution of ammonium molybdate. Vital methylene blue was formerly much used for examining the innervation of muscle, skin and internal organs. The mechanism of selective dye uptake is incompletely understood; vital staining of nerve fibers in skin is prevented by ouabain, a drug that inhibits the Na/K-ATPase of cell membranes.

Placebo
Methylene blue has been used as a placebo; physicians would tell their patients to expect their urine to change color and view this as a sign that their condition had improved. This same side effect makes methylene blue difficult to use in traditional placebo-controlled clinical studies, including those testing for its efficacy as a treatment.

Isobutyl nitrite toxicity
Isobutyl nitrite is one of the compounds used as poppers, an inhalant drug that induces a brief euphoria.

Isobutyl nitrite is known to cause methemoglobinemia. Severe methemoglobinemia may be treated with methylene blue.

Ifosfamide toxicity
Another use of methylene blue is to treat ifosfamide neurotoxicity. Methylene blue was first reported for treatment and prophylaxis of ifosfamide neuropsychiatric toxicity in 1994. A toxic metabolite of ifosfamide, chloroacetaldehyde (CAA), disrupts the mitochondrial respiratory chain, leading to an accumulation of nicotinamide adenine dinucleotide hydrogen (NADH). Methylene blue acts as an alternative electron acceptor, and reverses the NADH inhibition of hepatic gluconeogenesis while also inhibiting the transformation of chloroethylamine into chloroacetaldehyde, and inhibits multiple amine oxidase activities, preventing the formation of CAA.  The dosing of methylene blue for treatment of ifosfamide neurotoxicity varies, depending upon its use simultaneously as an adjuvant in ifosfamide infusion, versus its use to reverse psychiatric symptoms that manifest after completion of an ifosfamide infusion. Reports suggest that methylene blue up to six doses a day have resulted in improvement of symptoms within 10 minutes to several days. Alternatively, it has been suggested that intravenous methylene blue every six hours for prophylaxis during ifosfamide treatment in people with history of ifosfamide neuropsychiatric toxicity.  Prophylactic administration of methylene blue the day before initiation of ifosfamide, and three times daily during ifosfamide chemotherapy has been recommended to lower the occurrence of ifosfamide neurotoxicity.

Shock

It has also been used in septic shock and anaphylaxis.

Methylene blue consistently increases blood pressure in people with vasoplegic syndrome (redistributive shock), but has not been shown to improve delivery of oxygen to tissues or to decrease mortality.

Methylene blue has been used in calcium channel blocker toxicity as a rescue therapy for distributive shock unresponsive to first line agents. Evidence for its use in this circumstance is very poor and limited to a handful of case reports.

Side effects

Methylene blue is a monoamine oxidase inhibitor (MAOI), and if infused intravenously at doses exceeding 5 mg/kg, may precipitate serious serotonin toxicity, serotonin syndrome, if combined with any selective serotonin reuptake inhibitors (SSRIs) or other serotonin reuptake inhibitor (e.g., duloxetine, sibutramine, venlafaxine, clomipramine, imipramine).

It causes hemolytic anemia in carriers of the G6PD (favism) enzymatic deficiency.

Chemistry
Methylene blue is a formal derivative of phenothiazine. It is a dark green powder that yields a blue solution in water. The hydrated form has 3 molecules of water per unit of methylene blue.  Methylene blue has a pH of 6 in water(10g/L) at 25 °C (77 °F).

Preparation
This compound is prepared by oxidation of dimethyl-4-phenylenediamine in the presence of sodium thiosulfate:

Light absorption properties

The maximum absorption of light is near 670 nm. The specifics of absorption depend on a number of factors, including protonation, adsorption to other materials, and metachromasy - the formation of dimers and higher-order aggregates depending on concentration and other interactions:

Other uses

Redox indicator
Methylene blue is widely used as a redox indicator in analytical chemistry. Solutions of this substance are blue when in an oxidizing environment, but will turn colorless if exposed to a reducing agent. The redox properties can be seen in a classical demonstration of chemical kinetics in general chemistry, the "blue bottle" experiment. Typically, a solution is made of glucose (dextrose), methylene blue, and sodium hydroxide. Upon shaking the bottle, oxygen oxidizes methylene blue, and the solution turns blue. The dextrose will gradually reduce the methylene blue to its colorless, reduced form. Hence, when the dissolved dextrose is entirely consumed, the solution will turn blue again. The redox midpoint potential E' is +0.01 V.

Peroxide generator
Methylene blue is also a photosensitizer used to create singlet oxygen when exposed to both oxygen and light. It is used in this regard to make organic peroxides by a Diels-Alder reaction which is spin forbidden with normal atmospheric triplet oxygen.

Sulfide analysis
The formation of methylene blue after the reaction of hydrogen sulfide with dimethyl-p-phenylenediamine and iron(III) at pH 0.4 – 0.7 is used to determine by photometric measurements sulfide concentration in the range 0.020 to 1.50 mg/L (20 ppb to 1.5 ppm). The test is very sensitive and the blue coloration developing upon contact of the reagents with dissolved H2S is stable for 60 min. Ready-to-use kits such as the Spectroquant sulfide test facilitate routine analyses. The methylene blue sulfide test is a convenient method often used in soil microbiology to quickly detect in water the metabolic activity of sulfate reducing bacteria (SRB). It should be observed that in this test, methylene blue is a product of reaction and not a reagent.

The addition of a strong reducing agent, such as ascorbic acid, to a sulfide-containing solution is sometimes used to prevent sulfide oxidation from atmospheric oxygen. Although it is certainly a sound precaution for the determination of sulfide with an ion selective electrode, it might however hamper the development of the blue color if the freshly formed methylene blue is also reduced, as described here above in the paragraph on redox indicator.

Water testing

The adsorption of methylene blue serves as an indicator defining the adsorptive capacity of granular activated carbon in water filters. Adsorption of methylene blue is very similar to adsorption of pesticides from water, this quality makes methylene blue serve as a good predictor for filtration qualities of carbon. It is as well a quick method of comparing different batches of activated carbon of the same quality
A color reaction in an acidified, aqueous methylene blue solution containing chloroform can detect anionic surfactants in a water sample. Such a test is known as an MBAS assay (methylene blue active substances assay).

The MBAS assay cannot distinguish between specific surfactants, however. Some examples of anionic surfactants are carboxylates, phosphates, sulfates, and sulfonates.

Methylene blue value of fine aggregate
The methylene blue value is defined as the number of milliliter's standard methylene value solution decolorized 0.1 g of activated carbon (dry basis).
Methylene blue value reflects the amount of clay minerals in aggregate samples. In  materials science, methylene blue solution is successively added to fine aggregate which is being agitated in water.  The presence of free dye solution can be checked with stain test on a filter paper.

Biological staining
In biology, methylene blue is used as a dye for a number of different staining procedures, such as Wright's stain and Jenner's stain. Since it is a temporary staining technique, methylene blue can also be used to examine RNA or DNA under the microscope or in a gel: as an example, a solution of methylene blue can be used to stain RNA on hybridization membranes in northern blotting to verify the amount of nucleic acid present. While methylene blue is not as sensitive as ethidium bromide, it is less toxic and it does not intercalate in nucleic acid chains, thus avoiding interference with nucleic acid retention on hybridization membranes or with the hybridization process itself.

It can also be used as an indicator to determine whether eukaryotic cells such as yeast are alive or dead. The methylene blue is reduced in viable cells, leaving them unstained. However dead cells are unable to reduce the oxidized methylene blue and the cells are stained blue. Methylene blue can interfere with the respiration of the yeast as it picks up hydrogen ions made during the process.

Aquaculture
Methylene blue is used in aquaculture and by tropical fish hobbyists as a treatment for fungal infections. It can also be effective in treating fish infected with ich although a combination of malachite green and formaldehyde is far more effective against the parasitic protozoa Ichthyophthirius multifiliis. It is usually used to protect newly laid fish eggs from being infected by fungus or bacteria. This is useful when the hobbyist wants to artificially hatch the fish eggs.
Methylene Blue is also very effective when used as part of a "medicated fish bath" for treatment of ammonia, nitrite, and cyanide poisoning as well as for topical and internal treatment of injured or sick fish as a "first response".

History
Methylene blue has been described as "the first fully synthetic drug used in medicine." Methylene blue was first prepared in 1876 by German chemist Heinrich Caro.

Its use in the treatment of malaria was pioneered by Paul Guttmann and Paul Ehrlich in 1891. During this period before the first World War, researchers like Ehrlich believed that drugs and dyes worked in the same way, by preferentially staining pathogens and possibly harming them. Changing the cell membrane of pathogens is in fact how various drugs work, so the theory was partially correct although far from complete. Methylene blue continued to be used in the second World War, where it was not well liked by soldiers, who observed, "Even at the loo, we see, we pee, navy blue."  Antimalarial use of the drug has recently been revived. It was discovered to be an antidote to carbon monoxide poisoning and cyanide poisoning in 1933 by Matilda Brooks.

The blue urine was used to monitor psychiatric patients' compliance with medication regimes. This led to interest - from the 1890s to the present day - in the drug's antidepressant and other psychotropic effects. It became the lead compound in research leading to the discovery of chlorpromazine.

Names
The International Nonproprietary Name (INN) of methylene blue is methylthioninium chloride.

Research

Malaria
Methylene blue was identified by Paul Ehrlich about 1891 as a possible treatment for malaria. It disappeared as an anti-malarial during the Pacific War in the tropics, since American and Allied soldiers disliked its two prominent, but reversible side effects: turning the urine blue or green, and the sclera (the whites of the eyes) blue. Interest in its use as an anti-malarial has recently been revived, especially due to its low price. Several clinical trials are in progress, trying to find a suitable drug combination. According to studies on children in Africa, it appears to have efficacy against malaria, but the attempts to combine methylene blue with chloroquine were disappointing.

Alzheimer's
A Phase 3 clinical trial of LMTM (TauRx0237 or LMT-X), a derivative of methylene blue, failed to show any benefit against cognitive or functional decline in people with mild to moderate Alzheimer's disease. Disease progression for both the drug and the placebo were practically identical.

Bipolar disorder 
Methylene blue has been studied as an adjunctive medication in the treatment of bipolar disorder.

Infectious diseases
It has been studied in AIDS-related Kaposi's sarcoma, West Nile virus, and to inactivate Staphylococcus aureus, and HIV-1. Phenothiazine dyes and light have been known to have virucidal properties for over 70 years.

References

External links 
 
 

Antidotes
Genetics techniques
Histology
Redox indicators
Thiazine dyes
Vital stains
World Health Organization essential medicines
Monoamine oxidase inhibitors
Phenothiazines
Chlorides
Wikipedia medicine articles ready to translate
Dimethylamino compounds